This is a (minimal) list of people on postage stamps of the Central African Republic.

A
Otto Wilhelm Hermann von Abich (2011)
Ivan Aivazovsky (2011)
Alexander Alekhine (2011)
Muhammad Ali (2018)
Roald Amundsen (2018)
Andrey Avinoff (2011)

B
Johann Sebastian Bach (2011)
Olave Baden-Powell (2011)
Robert Baden-Powell (2011)
Brigitte Bardot (2011)
Florence Bascom (2011)
Ruth Elizabeth Becker (2011)
Elizabeth Blackburn (2011)
Timo Boll (2011)
Mikhail Botvinnik (2011)
François Boucher (2011)
Johannes Brahms (2011)
Pierre Marie Auguste Broussonet (2011)
Arthur Henry Reginald Buller (2011)

C
Catherine, Duchess of Cambridge (as "Prince William avec sa femme") (2011)
Evelyn Cheesman (2011)
Jacques Chirac (2011)
Bill Clinton (1996)

D
Dalai Lama (1996)
Edgar Degas (2011)
Ignacy Domeyko (2011)
Albrecht Dürer (2011)
Anthony van Dyck (2011)

E
Robert G. Edwards (2011)

F
Jean-Henri Fabre (2011)
Alexandra Feodorovna (2018)
Dian Fossey (2011)
Pope Francis (2018)

G
Yuri Gagarin (2011)
Mahatma Gandhi (1996, 2011)
Charles de Gaulle (2011)
Andre Geim (2011)
Dorothy Gibson (2011)
Vincent van Gogh (2011)

H
Eva Hart (2011)
Paul von Hindenburg (2018)

J
Pope John Paul II (2011)
as Saint John Paul II (2018)

K
Anatoly Karpov (2011)
John F. Kennedy (1996, 2018)
Coretta Scott King (2018)
Martin Luther King Jr. (1996, 2018)

L
Jean-Baptiste Lamarck (2011)
Pierre André Latreille (2011)
Jean Jules Linden (2011)
Wang Liqin (2011)
David Livingstone (2018)
Louis XIV (2018)
Marinus van der Lubbe (2018)

M
Nelson Mandela (1996, 2018)
Felix Mendelssohn (2011)
Auguste Michel-Lévy (2011)
Michelangelo (2011)
Amedeo Modigliani (2011)
Claude Monet (2011)
Marilyn Monroe (2011)
Paul Morphy (2011)
Wolfgang Amadeus Mozart (2011)
William Murrill (2011)

N
Edmond Navratil (2011)
Michel Marcel Navratil (as Lolo Navratil) (2011)
Nicholas II of Russia (2018)
Ding Ning (2011)

O
Eleanor Anne Ormerod (2011)

P
Camille Pissarro (2011)
Georges Pompidou (2011)
Elvis Presley (2011)
Léon Abel Provancher (2011)

R
Raphael (as Raffaello Sanzio) (2011)
Rembrandt van Rijn (2011)
Pierre-Auguste Renoir (2011)
Royal Family of Monaco:
Rainier III, Prince of Monaco (2018)
Princess Grace (2018)
Princess Stéphanie of Monaco (2018)
Caroline, Princess of Hanover (2018)
Albert II, Prince of Monaco (2018)
Peter Paul Rubens (2011)

S
Nicolas Sarkozy (2011)
Romy Schneider (2011)
Fred Jay Seaver (2011)
Liu Shiwen (2011)
Alfred Sisley (2011)
Vitaly Smirnov (2018)
Diana, Princess of Wales, as Diana Spencer (2011)
Vyacheslav Sreznevsky (2018)

T
Mother Teresa (1996)
Titian (as Tiziano Vecelli) (2011)
Joseph Pitton de Tournefort (2011)
Leonid Tyagachev (2018)

W
Elsie Maud Wakefield (2011)
Prince William, Duke of Cambridge (as Prince William) (2011)

Y
Ada Yonath (2011)

Z
Mao Zedong (2018)
Alexander Zhukov (2018)

References

Central African Republic
People, stamps
Stamps